Tragedy of Hyderabad is a history book written by the Last Prime Minister of Hyderabad, Mir Laik Ali. The book was written and published in 1962 by Mir Laik Ali who was on exile in Pakistan. The book translated into telugu by famous literary person dr. Enugu Narasimha Reddy as a 'Hyderabad Vishaadham'

References

External links
 Open Library

History books about India
Books about British India
Hyderabad State